Dylan Voller is an Aboriginal-Australian man who came to public attention after his detainment in a youth detention center in the Northern Territory was documented on a July 2016 episode of the ABC TV program Four Corners.

Early life
As of 2016, Voller had a troubled early life, and had been expelled and or excluded from primary schools in Alice Springs due to assaulting others, including breaking another child's arm in kindergarten. Dylan was in and out of juvenile detention since he was 11 years old, for car theft, robbery and assault. He spent time at Don Dale Youth Detention Centre in Darwin, Alice Springs Youth Detention Centre and, aged 17, at Alice Springs adult prison. During that time he has been involved in more than 300 prison incidents of, self harm, assault on staff and others (some requiring hospitalisation of victims) since he was jailed for aggravated robbery and endangering a police officer in 2014. Voller has served two of the three sentences given to him over a drug-fuelled crime spree in which he attacked a man and tried to run down a policeman. He spent time in Alice Springs Youth Detention Centre and the behavioral management unit at Don Dale Youth Detention Centre in Darwin. Dylan has a long history of self harm and suicidal actions requiring intervention by staff in juvenile facilities. During that time he was restrained by the neck, was at eleven years physically thrown into his cell, isolated, stripped naked and tear gassed.

Royal Commission

Footage of Voller shackled to a restraining chair within the adult Alice Springs correctional center was featured on the ABC TV program Four Corners' episode "Australia's Shame" in July 2016. It prompted Prime Minister Malcolm Turnbull to announce a royal commission into the treatment of youth in the child protection and youth detention systems in the Northern Territory. Mistreatment in youth detention had been widely reported prior to the Four Corners report.

He has publicly apologised for his crimes.

Voller gave limited evidence at the Royal Commission into the Protection and Detention of Children in the Northern Territory in December 2016.

He was released from prison in February 2017 and has been advocating for improved conditions for youth in detention.

In 2017 it was discovered that Voller's confidential files were dumped at the Alice Springs rubbish tip. Footage of Voller was posted on Facebook on a Fairfax media account and derogatory comments were made on the post by others. Voller subsequently sued Fairfax media for defamation. Social Media Consultant Ryan Shelley testified as an expert witness and illustrated that it was within Fairfax media's power to remove the defamatory comments. The Judge ruled that Fairfax media's failure to remove the comments was grounds to hold Fairfax liable for defamation.

In September 2021, the Australian High Court ruled that media companies could be held liable for allegedly defamatory material posted to their social media pages.  Voller's case returned to the lower court for determination. This area of law is currently being reviewed by the Attorneys-General of the Federal government and each State and Territory. In response to the decision in Voller's case, the Federal Government has drafted the Social Media (Anti-Trolling) Bill. Which if enacted will clarify defamation law within the context of social media.

Later life 
In 2019, the 21 year old Voller plead guilty to staging a bomb hoax at the Commonwealth Games marathon in Gold Coast. On 1 February 2020 Voller was sentenced to a 10-month prison sentence due to an incident in which he jumped on railway tracks, exposed his penis and assaulted a transit guard in Western Australia. Voller also had a warrant issued for his arrest by the Deniliquin Local Court in NSW on 19 June 2020 in relation to an armed robbery that occurred in Moama, NSW in May 2019.

References

People from the Northern Territory
1997 births
Living people
Australian indigenous rights activists
Australian people of German descent